Espace Balard was a major music venue located in Paris, France. It was particularly popular in the early to mid-1980s hosting many notable artists, such as Ozzy Osbourne, Judas Priest, Dio, Metallica, Kiss, Ted Nugent, Blue Öyster Cult, Black Sabbath, Iron Maiden, Whitesnake, Peter Gabriel and Motörhead.

References

Music venues in Paris